Vika Martirosyan (birth name Viktorya Martirosyan, born 15 February 1985, Yerevan, Armenian SSR, USSR) is an Armenian choreographer and dancer.

Biography 
Vika Martirosyan was born in Yerevan, Soviet Armenia, on February 15, 1985, in a family of artists. Her parents were soloists of "Tatul Altunyan State Song and Dance Ensemble". Her sister is a dancer as well.

Education 
From 1991 to 1994 she studied at the "Barekamutyun" dance ensemble after Hovsep Shamamyan. In 1992 she entered and then graduated from French immersion Secondary school No. 119 named after Nelson Stepanian. In 1994 she studied at the classical dance department of Yerevan Dancing Art State college. From 2013 to 2018 she studied part-time in the dance department at the Armenian State Pedagogical University after Khachatur Abovyan and received bachelor's degree with honour.

Career 
After graduating from the college in 2003, she was admitted to A. Spendiaryan National Academic Opera and Ballet Theater as a ballet actress. She has worked there for five years after that she continued her activity as the Art director of "Amaras" dance ensemble. The latter was founded on October 25, 1995, according to the idea of his father Ashot Martirosyan, after the church in Artsakh. On October 25, 2015, the Academic Opera and Ballet Theater hosted a solo concert dedicated to the 20th anniversary of the "Amaras" Dance Ensemble by representatives of the Armenian show business (Silva Hakobyan, Arame, Eric, Hripsime Hakobyan, Martin Mkrtchyan, Christine Pepelyan, Angelina Gasparyan, Gevorg Martirosyan, etc.). On May 2, 2017, the personal video of the "Amaras" dance ensemble was released, directed by Artyom Abovyan. On July 10, 2018, the Gabriel Sundukyan National Academic Theater hosted a dance performance by the "Amaras" Dance Ensemble called "Treasures of Amaras". 380 dance group students of all ages took part in this musical performance. In February 2021, the new studio of AMARAS DANCE STUDIO was founded.

Junior Eurovision Song Contest 2019 
Following the results of the 2019 Armenian Junior Eurovision Song Contest, it became known that Karina Ignatyan will represent Armenia in the Junior Eurovision 2019 international song contest. The lyrics of her song "Colors Of Your Dream" were written by Avet Barseghyan and Margarita Doroshich, and the author of the music was Russian composer Taras Demchuk. Vika Martirosyan was the organizer and choreographer of the dance in both the video clip and stage performance.

Video Clips

Participation 
Vika Martirosyan has taken part in many international festivals and competitions.
 2007: Armenian Music Awards - festival performance director
 2008: Participation in the annual Cannes International Film Festival, France
 2010: Special invitation to perform a ballet troupe in Almaty, Kazakhstan
 2017: Participation in the "Armenia Europe Music Awards" on March 26 in Paris, France
 (director of dance performances / choreographer)
 2018: Participation in the "Ensembl" competition of Georgian national dances

Awards 
 1998: Amadeus International Competition Festival (bronze medalist, lauréate)
 2002: "ВАГАНОВА – PRIX " 5th International Ballet Competition (2nd place) in St. Petersburg
 2002: Prix de Lausanne compétition (lauréate), Switzerland
 2005: "Crane/ Կռունկ" festival (Grand Prix), Armenia
 2007: "I/ Ես" Awards (Best Group of the Year)
 2014: 21 TV Armenian Music Awards Best Dance Video of the Year Award (Lilit Hovhannisyan "Well, don’t ever")
 2017: Received Certificate by the Union of Dance Artists of Armenia after Vanush Khanamiryan.

Personal life 
Vika Martirosyan is married with two children.

References

External links 
 Official YouTube channel
 Step by step interview with Vika Martirosyan
 Vika Martirosyan/ AMARAS. with Diana: an Interview
 At the daylight" with Dina, Nanul, Vika Martirosyan
 Star Style: Vika Martirosyan
Insta SHOW - Vika Martirosyan 
"I exist/ Ես կամ". 30.01.2016 Vika Martirosyan
Vika Martirosyan stage choreographer of Armenia’s  act at the Junior Eurovision Song Contest 2019
Choreography: Vika Martirosyan (Amaras Dance Studio) Karina Ignatyan - Colours Of Your Dream - Armenia - Official Music Video - Junior Eurovision
Junior Eurovision Song Contest Diary 14.11.2019 / Vika Martirosyan Artistic Director of "Amaras" Dance Ensemble: Interview

Armenian dancers
1985 births
Living people
Ballet dancers
Armenian female dancers
Armenian State Pedagogical University alumni